Sprecher von Bernegg may refer to:

 Sprecher von Bernegg family, a Swiss noble house

Sprecher von Bernegg is the surname of:

 Anton Adolf Christoph Sprecher von Bernegg (1849–1915), a judge at the German Reichsgericht
 Fortunat Sprecher von Bernegg (1585–1647), a Swiss lawyer and diplomat
 Soloman Sprecher von Bernegg (1697–1758), a Habsburg field marshal
 Theophil Sprecher von Bernegg (1850–1927), a Swiss politician and Chief of the General staff
 Andreas Sprecher von Bernegg (1871–1951), a Swiss botanist
 Jörg Sprecher von Bernegg (1907–1997), Swiss member of the General staff, nephew of Theophil Sprecher von Bernegg